Juan de Garay y Becerra (1558–1638) was a Spanish nobleman, who served during the Viceroyalty of Peru as alcalde and lieutenant governor of Santa Fe (Argentina).

He was born in Asunción (Paraguay), son of the founder of Buenos Aires Don Juan de Garay and Doña Isabel de Becerra, daughter of Francisco de Becerra and Isabel de Contreras y Mendoza, belonging to a distinguished family. He was married to Juana de Saavedra, daughter of Martín Suárez de Toledo and María de Sanabria. And the sister of Hernando Arias de Saavedra, governor of the Río de la Plata and Paraguay. 

His second wife was Juana de Espindola y Palomino, daughter of Spanish conquistadores.

References

External links 

euskomedia.org

1558 births
1638 deaths
People from Buenos Aires
Explorers of Argentina
People from Santa Fe, Argentina
Spanish colonial governors and administrators
Río de la Plata
Viceroyalty of Peru people